Andrew Major (born 1976), known professionally as Maggot, is a Welsh rapper.

Goldie Lookin Chain 

Several Goldie Lookin Chain songs have been written about him. These include "The Maggot" (Greatest Hits); based on the tune of "You've Got to Pick a Pocket or Two" from the musical Oliver! and "Maneater" by Hall & Oates together with a Steeleye Span hook. "The Maggot" also namechecks Fagin, Dick Turpin, Penelope Keith and Kylie Minogue and features fellow GLC member Mystikal.

Another song, "Maggot at Midnight" (from Safe as Fuck), namechecks Dr. Jekyll and Mr. Hyde, Nosferatu, The Crystal Maze, Michael Jackson and Jackson's song "Thriller", and features a sample from the television show 'Danger Mouse'. Another short track he features on is called "Maggot's Stand-Up" where Maggot does a short stand-up comic style set; it mostly features scatological references. Maggot also identifies himself as The Hip Hop Vampire, which is one of his aliases. He's also the subject of the GLC song "Six Feet Tall" which features Lionel Richies "Easy Like Sunday Morning" as the background track and is a tribute to Maggot, basically reminiscing on his time with the GLC and how they miss him in the band. 

Maggot, like the other members of the group is a supporter of Newport County AFC although he has never seen them play.
Maggot has now left Goldie Lookin Chain to pursue other interests.  He currently works as a financial advisor.

Celebrity Big Brother and later 

He appeared in the fourth series of Celebrity Big Brother in 2006, finishing third, trailing Michael Barrymore and eventual winner Chantelle Houghton.

In 2018 Major became a financial consultant for Newport firm UCF. The company arranges up to 95 per cent of the value of the invoices of small and medium-sized enterprises to be bought by third-party finance houses.

References

External links 

Welsh male rappers
Living people
People from Newport, Wales
1976 births